Uzmi me (kad hoćeš ti) is a live double album by the Bosnian band Crvena jabuka. The album was recorded during a 1989 tour of the promotion of their fourth studio album Tamo gdje ljubav počinje. It was released in 1990 one year after the concert at the Zagreb Sports Arena.

One single on this album is the song "Bacila je sve niz rijeku" which was originally done by Sarajevo band Indexi.

Track listing

CD1
 "Sve što imaš ti"
 "Neka se sanja"
 "Zovu nas ulice"
 "Nek' te on ljubi"
 "Nema više vremena"
 "Otrov"
 "Ostani"
 "S Tvojih Usana"
 "Volio bih da si tu"
 "Tugo nesrećo"
 "Za sve ove godine"
 "Uzmi me (kad hoćeš ti)"
 "Kad se kazaljke poklope"

CD2
 "Bacila je sve niz rijeku"
 "Tuga ti i ja"
 "Ti znaš"
 "Ne dam da ovaj osjećaj ode"
 "Tamo gdje ljubav počinje"
 "Ima nešto od srca do srca"
 "Bježi kišo s prozora"
 "Dirlija"
 "Sviđa mi se ova stvar"
 "To mi radi"
 "Sanjati"
 "Suzo moja strpi se"

Album information
This live double album was recorded in the Sports Arena in Zagreb. The date is still unknown.

The concert had at least 30 songs, but "Čarolija", "Zvona zvone", and  "Ne daj na sebe" had to be omitted to make it a double album.

Personnel
Zlatko Arslanagic – guitar
Drazen Zeric – vocals
Darko Jelcic – drums, percussion
Srdan Serberzia – bass guitar
Zlatko Vorelovic – keyboards

Crvena jabuka albums
1990 live albums